The following is a list of the 40 communes of the Seine-Saint-Denis department of France.

Since January 2016, all communes of Seine-Saint-Denis are part of the intercommunality Métropole du Grand Paris

Seine-Saint-Denis